Fortrose (with Rosemarkie) in Ross-shire was a burgh constituency that elected one commissioner to the Parliament of Scotland and to the Convention of Estates.

After the Acts of Union 1707, Fortrose, Forres, Nairn and Inverness formed the Inverness district of burghs, returning one member between them to the House of Commons of Great Britain.

List of burgh commissioners

 1661–63: Alexander Grahame of Drynie  
 1665 convention: Hugh Dallas 
 1667 convention: John Gellie 
 1669–74: Alexander Forrester 
 1678 convention: Hugh Bailie
 1681–82, 1685–86, 1689 convention, 1689: Robert Innes, bailie (fined for non-attendance, 1689) 
 1692–1701: Donald (or Daniel) Simpson the younger 
 1702–03: John Mackenzie of Assint, provost (died c.1703)
 1703–07: Roderick McKenzie of Prestonhall

See also
 List of constituencies in the Parliament of Scotland at the time of the Union

References

Politics of the county of Ross
History of the Scottish Highlands
Constituencies of the Parliament of Scotland (to 1707)
Constituencies disestablished in 1707
1707 disestablishments in Scotland